The Rwanda five-toed skink (Leptosiaphos graueri) is a species of lizard in the family Scincidae. It is found in Africa.

References

Leptosiaphos
Reptiles described in 1912
Taxa named by Richard Sternfeld